Nikolai Ivanovich Parshin (January 28, 1929December 16, 2012) was a Soviet football player and manager. He was born in Moscow.

Honours
 Soviet Top League winner: 1952, 1953, 1956.
 Soviet Cup winner: 1950.

International career
Parshin played his only game for USSR on August 21, 1955, in a friendly against West Germany, scoring a goal in that game.

External links
  Profile

References 

1929 births
2012 deaths
Footballers from Moscow
Russian footballers
Soviet footballers
Soviet Union international footballers
Soviet football managers
FC Spartak Moscow players
FC Shakhtar Donetsk players
FC Zimbru Chișinău players
FC Shinnik Yaroslavl players
FC Arsenal Tula players
Soviet Top League players
Association football midfielders
FC Torpedo Moscow players